Jacobus Van Der Spiegel (February 5, 1668 – 1708), also known as Jacobus Vander Spiegel, was an early American silversmith, active in New York City.

Van Der Spiegel was born in New York City, where he married Ann Saunders on 21 September 21, 1692, and with whom he had three children. He served in the Union Army along the Albany frontier. He was appointed in 1698 as Constable in New York City, freeman on February 24, 1701, and served as a Deacon of the Reformed Dutch Church at various times from 1703 until his death. His work is collected in the Brooklyn Museum, Metropolitan Museum of Art, Winterthur Museum, and Yale University Art Gallery.

References 
 "Jacobus Van Der Spiegel", American Silversmiths.
 American Silversmiths and Their Marks: The Definitive (1948) Edition, Stephen G. C. Ensko, Courier Corporation, 2012, page 134.
 American Silver of the XVII & XVIII Centuries: A Study Based on the Clearwater Collection, Alphonso Trumpbour Clearwater, Clara Louise Avery, Metropolitan Museum of Art, 1920, pages 20–21.
 American silver at Winterthur, Ian M. G. Quimby, Dianne Johnson, Henry Francis du Pont Winterthur Museum, 1995, page 308.
 Documents of the Senate of the State of New York, Volume 6, New York (State) Legislature, Senate, 1904, pages 1444–1445.
 Manual of the Corporation of the City of New York, 1863, page 821.

American silversmiths
1668 births
1708 deaths